Eugnosta umtamvuna is a species of moth of the  family Tortricidae. It is found in South Africa.

The wingspan is about 10 mm. The ground colour is cream white, slightly mixed with yellow in the distal third. The markings are brown tinged with rust: the costa browner in the basal third. The subdorsal blotch and costal remnant of the median fascia are present and there are weak, paler markings from the tornus. The hindwings are greyish white.

Etymology
The specific name refers to Umtamvuna Nature Reserve, the type locality.

References

Moths described in 2015
Eugnosta